Shree Guru Gobind Singh Tricentenary University, commonly called as SGT University, is located in Budhera, Gurugram district, Haryana, India, in the vicinity of Sultanpur National Park.

History
The university (earlier known as the SGT Group of Institutions) came into existence in 2013 through a Government of Haryana Legislative Act. The University is operated by the Dashmesh Educational Charitable Trust.

Faculties
The University offers Undergraduate to Ph.D. level degrees in medical, engineering, and management sciences within the following faculties:
Faculty of Medicine & Health Sciences
Faculty of Engineering & Technology
Faculty of Law
Faculty of Commerce & Management
Faculty of Mass Comm. & Media Tech.
Faculty of Hotel & Tourism Management
Faculty of Science
Faculty of Education
SGT College of Pharmacy
Faculty of Dental Sciences
Faculty of Indian Medical System
Faculty of Nursing
Faculty of Physiotherapy
Faculty of Behavioral Sciences
Faculty of Allied Health Sciences
Faculty of Fashion & Design
Faculty of Agricultural Sciences

See also

 List of medical colleges in Haryana

References

External links
 

Hospitals in Haryana
Medical colleges in Haryana
Teaching hospitals in India
Gurgaon district
Educational institutions established in 2013
2013 establishments in Haryana
Memorials to Guru Gobind Singh